The 2000 NCAA Division I Women's Tennis Championships were the 19th annual championships to determine the national champions of NCAA Division I women's singles, doubles, and team collegiate tennis in the United States.

Georgia defeated defending champions Stanford in the team final, 5–4, to claim their second national title.

Host
This year's tournaments were hosted by Pepperdine University at the Ralphs-Straus Tennis Center in Malibu, California. This was the Waves' second time hosting the women's championships. 

The men's and women's NCAA tennis championships would not be held jointly until 2006.

See also
NCAA Division II Tennis Championships (Men, Women)
NCAA Division III Tennis Championships (Men, Women)

References

External links
List of NCAA Women's Tennis Champions

NCAA Division I tennis championships
NCAA Division I Women's Tennis Championships
NCAA Division I Women's Tennis Championships
NCAA Division I Women's Tennis Championships